The 2017–18 ISL Players Draft was a players draft conducted by the Indian Super League on 23 July 2017.

Format
Regulations for the 2017–18 Indian Super League season allow for each club to have a minimum of 15 Indian players and a maximum of 18, which include two mandatory under-21 players. Prior to the draft, each club was allowed to retain a maximum of two senior players from the previous season (2016–17 I-League for Bengaluru FC) as well as retaining up to three under-21 players.

The draft had a total of 15 rounds. New expansion side, Jamshedpur FC, had the first pick in both the first and second rounds. Them and Delhi Dynamos, who didn't retain a single player from the previous season, were the only sides who participate in the first round of the draft. The order for which each team participated in the draft was determined on Saturday, 22 July 2017. Clubs also had the option to use an "Instant Trading Card" during the draft which allowed them to trade a picked player to another club.

Players available
On 22 July 2017, before the draft commenced, the official list of players available for selection were announced. The players listed were:

Player selection

Round 1
Only Jamshedpur FC and Delhi Dynamos entered the draft in this round.

Round 2
Only Pune City entered the draft in this round.

Round 3
Atlético de Kolkata, Bengaluru FC, Goa, Kerala Blasters, Mumbai City, and NorthEast United all entered in this round.

Round 3 trades

Round 4
Chennaiyin entered in this round.

Round 4 trades

Round 5

Round 5 trades

Round 6

Round 7

Round 8

Round 9

Round 10

Round 11

Round 12

Round 13

Round 14

Round 15

See also
 List of 2017–18 Indian Super League season roster changes

References

2017–18 Indian Super League season
Indian Super League drafts
ISL Inaugural Domestic Draft
2010s in Mumbai
Football in Mumbai
Events in Mumbai